Retiskenea diploura is a species of sea snail, a marine gastropod mollusk in the superfamily Neomphaloidea.

Description

Distribution

References

External links

Neomphaloidea
Gastropods described in 2001